Mohammad Khaled al-Rahmoun (born 1957) is a former military commander, the current Syrian Minister of the Interior.

See also
Cabinet of Syria
Law enforcement in Syria

References

1957 births
Living people
Syrian ministers of interior
People of the Syrian civil war
People from Idlib Governorate
Syrian generals
Syrian Sunni Muslims
Arab Socialist Ba'ath Party – Syria Region politicians